The Scampi 30 is a family of Swedish sailboats that was designed by Peter Norlin as an International Offshore Rule (IOR) Half Ton class cruiser-racer and first built in 1970. The design was Norlin's first and proved to be both a sail racing and commercial success.

Production
The design was built in four versions by a number of different builders, including Älvdalsplast AB, Shipman Sweden AB and Albin Marine (all in Sweden), Nautic Saintonge in France, Yamaha Corporation in Japan and the Solna Corporation in the US. Production ceased in 1982, with about 1,000 boats of all marks built.

Sailboatdata.com notes, "the Scampi was Peter Norlin's first yacht design. It's hard to think of a case where the first effort of any designer achieved similar success."

Design

The Scampi 30 was designed as an IOR Half Ton class boat.

The Scampi 30 is a recreational keelboat, built predominantly of fibreglass, with wood trim. All versions have masthead sloop rigs with aluminum spars, deck-stepped masts, wire standing rigging and a single set of unswept spreaders. The hulls all have raked stems; raised counter, reverse transoms; skeg-mounted rudders controlled by a tiller and a fixed fin keels. All models displace  and carry  of ballast.

The design has sleeping accommodation for five people, with a double "V"-berth in the bow cabin, two straight settees in the main cabin and an aft cabin with a single quarter berth on the port side. The galley is located on the starboard side just forward of the companionway ladder. The galley is equipped with a three-burner stove and a sink. A navigation station is opposite the galley, on the port side. The head is located just aft of the bow cabin on the port side.

The Scampi 30 has a PHRF racing handicap of 162 to 192.

Variants
Scampi 30-1 (Mk I)
There was just one Mk I built, the prototype, which won the Half Ton Cup in 1969, held under Royal Ocean Racing Club (RORC) handicapping rules.
Scampi 30-2 (Mk II)
This model was introduced in 1970 and produced by Älvdalsplast AB in Sweden until 1971 and Nautic Saintonge in France, with at least 50 boats built. Racing under the new IOR it placed first and second in 1970.
Scampi 30-3 (Mk III)
This model was introduced in 1971 and built until 1973, with nearly 200 boats built. It was built by several companies, including the Yamaha Corporation in Japan, as the original Yamaha 30. In the International Half Ton Cup competition held in the United Kingdom it took first, second and third places.
Scampi 30-4 (Mk IV)
This model was introduced in 1973 and built until 1982, with about 750 boats completed. It was built by Älvdalsplast AB from 1973 to 1974, by Shipman Sweden AB in 1975, by Albin Marine from 1976 to 1982 and by the Solna Corporation.

Operational history
The boat is supported by an active class club based in Sweden, that organizes racing events, the Scampiförbundet (English: The Scampi Association).

See also
List of sailing boat types

References

External links

Video: Scampi 30 surfing in Puget Sound at 12.4 knots in 25 knot winds
Video: A fast sailboat and family cruiser Scampi 30

Keelboats
1960s sailboat type designs
Sailing yachts
Sailboat type designs by Peter Norlin
Sailboat types built by Albin Marine
Sailboat types built by Shipman Sweden AB